is the Germanic variant of lieutenant general, used in some German speaking countries.

Austria

Generalleutnant is the second highest general officer rank in the Austrian Armed Forces (Bundesheer), roughly equivalent to the NATO rank of OF-8.

Belgium

Germany

Generalleutnant, short GenLt, ('lieutenant general') is the second highest general officer rank in the German Army (Heer) and the German Air Force (Luftwaffe). This three-star rank in other countries is lieutenant general.

Rank in modern Germany
The rank is rated OF-8 in NATO, and is grade B9 in the pay rules of the Federal Ministry of Defence. It is equivalent to Vizeadmiral in the German Navy (Marine), or to Generaloberstabsarzt, and Admiraloberstabsarzt in the Zentraler Sanitätsdienst der Bundeswehr. On the shoulder straps (Heer, Luftwaffe) there are three golden pips (stars) in golden oak leaves.

History

German armies and air forces until 1945

Generalleutnant of the Wehrmacht
Generalleutnant was in the German Reich, and Nazi Germany the second lowest general officer rank, comparable to the two-star rank in many NATO-armed forces (Rangcode OF-7). It was equivalent to Vizeadmiral in the Kriegsmarine, and SS-Gruppenführer in the Waffen-SS until 1945.

Rank insignia Generalleutnant/ Vizeadmiral

National People's Army
 was in the so-called armed organs of the GDR, represented by Ministry of National Defence, and Ministry for State Security, the second lowest general officer rank, comparable to the two-star rank in many NATO-Armed forces. This was in reference to Soviet military doctrine and in line with other armed forces of the Warsaw Pact.

Insignia

See also
Comparative military ranks of World War I
Comparative military ranks of World War II
Ranks of the National People's Army

Notes

References

Military ranks of Germany
Two-star officers of Nazi Germany
Three-star officers of the Bundeswehr

de:Generalleutnant